Chakaneh-ye Olya (also Romanized as Chakaneh-ye ‘Olyā; also known as Chakaneh-ye Bālā) is a village in Sarvelayat Rural District, Sarvelayat District, Nishapur County, Razavi Khorasan Province, Iran. At the 2006 census, its population was 329, in 109 families.

References 

Populated places in Nishapur County